The 1906 Idaho gubernatorial election was held on November 6, 1906. Incumbent Republican Frank R. Gooding defeated Democratic nominee Charles Stockslager with 52.18% of the vote.

General election

Candidates
Major party candidates
Frank R. Gooding, Republican 
Charles Stockslager, Democratic

Other candidates
Thomas F. Kelley, Socialist

Results

References

1906
Idaho
Gubernatorial